

Hans Schleef (19 July 1920 – 31 December 1944) was a pilot in the Luftwaffe of Nazi Germany and recipient of the Knight's Cross of the Iron Cross during World War II.

Awards
 Ehrenpokal der Luftwaffe (23 September 1941)
 German Cross in Gold on 4 May 1942 as Feldwebel in the 7./Jagdgeschwader 3
 Knight's Cross of the Iron Cross on 9 May 1942 as Feldwebel and pilot in the 7./Jagdgeschwader 3 "Udet"

References

Citations

Bibliography

 Bergström. Christer (2007). Kursk – The Air Battle, July 1943. Classic Publications 
 
 
 

1920 births
1944 deaths
Luftwaffe pilots
German World War II flying aces
Luftwaffe personnel killed in World War II
Recipients of the Gold German Cross
Recipients of the Knight's Cross of the Iron Cross
Aviators killed by being shot down
People from Salzlandkreis
Military personnel from Saxony-Anhalt